James "Clay" Ives (born September 5, 1972) is a Canadian-born American luger who competed from the early 1990s until his 2002 retirement. Competing in three Winter Olympics (the first two with Canada, the last with the United States), he won the bronze medal in the men's doubles event at the 2002 Winter Olympics in Salt Lake City. He was born in Bancroft, Ontario.

References

1994 luge men's doubles results (todor66.com)

FIL-Luge profile

Luge Canada profile (luge.ca)

External links 
 
 
 
 

1972 births
American male lugers
Canadian male lugers
Living people
Lugers at the 1994 Winter Olympics
Lugers at the 1998 Winter Olympics
Lugers at the 2002 Winter Olympics
People from New York (state)
Sportspeople from Ontario
Olympic lugers of the United States
Olympic lugers of Canada
Medalists at the 2002 Winter Olympics
Olympic bronze medalists for the United States in luge